TESOL Quarterly is a quarterly peer-reviewed academic journal published by Wiley-Blackwell on behalf of TESOL International Association. It covers English language teaching and learning, standard English as a second dialect, including articles on the psychology and sociology of language learning and teaching, professional preparation, curriculum development, and testing and evaluation. The editors-in-chief are Charlene Polio and Peter De Costa, both at Michigan State University. TESOL also publishes TESOL Journal.

According to the Journal Citation Reports, the journal had a 2016 impact factor of 2.056, ranking it 14th out of 182 journals in the category "Linguistics" and 34th out of 235 journals in the category "Education & Educational Research". There has been a substantial increase in the past three years under the editorial leadership of previous editors, Brian Paltridge and Ahmar Mahboob, both of the University of Sydney: the 2015 impact factor was 1.513, and 2014 impact factor was 0.940.

History 
At the April 1963 annual conference of the National Association for Foreign Student Affairs (NAFSA), now stands for Association of International Educators, there was a suggestion about a small conference of representatives from various kinds of ESOL programs. The pilot meeting was held in D.C. on September 12, 1963. There were representatives from NAFSA, Center for Applied Linguistics (CAL), the National Council of Teachers of English (NCTE), the Modern Language Association (MLA), the Speech Association of America (SAA), the Bureau of Indian Affairs, the state educational systems of California, Michigan, Florida, Arizona, New Mexico, the city of New York, and Canada. They decided that a national convention on the teaching of English to speakers of other languages should be held in Arizona, May 8–9, 1964. They also decided that there was a need for a professional journal associated with the conference. The first conference took place with 700 participants. At this point, TESOL organization was called The National Advisory Council on Teaching of English as a Foreign Language (NACTEFL). An ad hoc committee representing professional organizations, state educational systems, and individuals concerned with the teaching of English to speakers of other languages met on January 30, 1965. They prepared a brief for the meeting and came up with a questionnaire to enable any and all members of the Teaching English to Speakers of Other Languages, Inc. (TESOL) was established in 1966. Thus, TESOL became its own separate organization. At the third annual meeting, they also made the first steps for TESOL Quarterly and they appointed their first editor, Betty Wallace Robinett from Ball State University, Indiana.

Volume 1, Issue 1 of the Quarterly was published in March 1967. In the editorial of the first issue, the emphasis is put on practical matters. Moreover, even at its initiation, TESOL had global goals. It was concerned with English as a Second Language, as well as English as a Foreign Language. The first issue raised three concerns for the field; there is a high demand for ESL or EFL overseas, there are more than 100,000 foreign students in the U.S. and Canada and there is a need to help raise the language competence of these students, and lastly, there are several millions of residents in the U.S. whose first language is not English and teachers need support.

The first issue also listed goals for the journal and the organization. Brief version of the goals is as follows;

 a central office, with a TESOL library
 development of the journal as the central organ of the profession
 a newsletter relevant to the TESOL field
 a national register of competent personnel
 a publishing program, in addition to the journal and the newsletter. which will offer pamphlets, fliers, reprints, recordings, etc. 
 a speaking and consulting program for workshops and professional development
 an annual convention
 planned program of national and regional meetings
 organization cooperation with other organizations

Also, there were several goals about what TESOL could achieve nationally;

 Appointment of TESL specialist in a high position of the U.S. Office of Education
 Appointment of a TESL specialist as a consultant in every state where there is a TESOL program 
 Recognition of the problem by school administration about the needs of ESL students
 Establishments of national guidelines for certification and preparation of teachers
 Increased research in the pedagogy of ESL

Some of the topics from the first issue were; teaching the sounds of English, the place of dictations in the ESL classroom, teaching reading and composition, the need for materials for teaching to Southwestern Indian speakers, teaching English to Spanish-English speakers, current trends of teaching English in France, curriculum trends in TESOL, programs administered by the U.S. department of Education.

50th Anniversary 
On the 50th anniversary, TESOL Quarterly titled their annual report (2016) "Reflecting Forward". In this report, it is stated that, based on the 2015-2016 data, TESOL has more than 11,000 members in 160 countries. In addition, it started to provide grants and awards to its members. Each award provides up to US$2500 for applicants who are currently working on research or would like to start research projects that are aligned with the TESOL Research Agenda. TESOL received 67 grant request submissions in 2016.

In terms of publishing, articles from expanding circle countries increased dramatically around the 1990s. Also, studies in EFL countries increased in the past 20 years and most of these articles came from Asia Pacific contexts. In this report, Canagarajah summarizes the changes and the emerging trends as follows;

 from product to process and practice
 from cognitive to social and ecological
 from pre-packacged methods to situated pedagogies and language socialization
 from studying controlled classrooms and experimental settings to everyday contexts and ecologies
 from the homogeneous to variation and inclusive plurality
 from knowledge or skills to identities, beliefs, and ideologies 
 from objective to personal and reflexive
 from the generalized and global to specific and local

See also 

List of applied linguistics journals

References

External links 
 

Wiley-Blackwell academic journals
English-language journals
Publications established in 1967
Quarterly journals
Linguistics journals
English as a second or foreign language